The Tigre Juan Award is a Spanish literary award created in 1977 in honor of the novel Tigre Juan. El curandero de su honra by Ramón Pérez de Ayala. It is awarded to the best narrative work in Spanish published in the preceding year. It has had different sponsors: the founders, the Cervantes Bookstore, the Asturian Center, the City Council of Oviedo (1986–2009) and the Tribuna Ciudadana cultural association.

History

It was presented for the first time at the Tigre Juan pub, located at Calle Mon No. 16, a meeting place for artists in the old area of Oviedo that was owned by Álvarez Otero, the award's first sponsor.

In 1986, the Municipal Culture Foundation of the City Council took over the award, expanding its monetary prize and providing it with an organizational infrastructure in order to achieve a greater national presence. Four years later the bases of the contest were modified in order to reward the best first published narrative work, and made the award into the first one that supported, in addition to the author, the publisher who was taking a risk on a writer's first work. Its winners were generally young (although the 26th edition was won by 74-year-old filmmaker and novelist José Luis Borau).

This second stage, in which the award achieved its greatest prominence, lasted until 2003. A new change in the bases led to awards from 2004 to 2007 for unpublished novels by established or well-known authors, but in 2008 it resumed the modality of awarding the best first narrative work in Spanish.

The first endowment of this award was 100,000 pesetas; the 2009 award was €54,000 (€40,000 for the author and the rest for the publisher). The award was canceled in January and was delivered in May of the following year during the Oviedo Book Fair. In November 2009, citing the economic crisis as a reason, the city council announced that it was suspending its financing. Now the prize – a statuette inspired by an engraving by the Asturian artist Jaime Herrero and representing the character Tigre Juan – is given in the autumn and has no financial endowment.

Winners
 1978,  for Jonás (later published by KRK Ediciones)
 1979, Luis Marañón for Ojos en la noche (later self-published by the author)
 1980,  for Jardín de Orates (later published by the Cervantes Bookstore and Ediciones del Serbal)
 1981,  for Otras mujeres y Fabia (later published by Argos Vergara)
 1982,  for Cosas de la transición (later published by Argos Vergara)
 1983, Santiago Araúz de Robles for La agonía florida de Carlos Brito (later published by Argos Vergara)
 1984,  for La cruzada del perro (later published by Júcar)
 1985,  for El cadáver bajo el jardín (later published by Júcar)
 1986,  for El viaje del obispo de Abisinia a los Santuarios de la Cristiandad (later published by Júcar)
 1987,  for Sasia la viuda (later published by Júcar)
 1988, Luis Sepúlveda for Un viejo que leía novelas de amor (later published by Júcar)
 1989, Antonio Belmonte for La armada invendible (later published by Júcar)
 1990,  for Qué te voy a contar, Anagrama
 1991, Francisco Casavella for El triunfo, Versal
 1992, Enriqueta Antolín for La gata con alas, Alfaguara
 1993, Belén Gopegui for La escala de los mapas, Anagrama
 1994,  for Cuentos de un escritor sin éxito, Pretextos
 1995, Ismael Grasa for De Madrid al cielo, Anagrama
 1996,  for Los seres heridos, Ediciones Nobel
 1997,  for Fabulosas narraciones por historias, Lengua de Trapo
 1998, Imma Monsó for Nunca se sabe, Tusquets
 1999, Fernando Palazuelos for La trastienda azul, Lengua de Trapo
 2000, Rodrigo Brunori for Me manda Stradivarius, Debate
 2001, Pablo Tusset for Lo mejor que le puede pasar a un cruasán, Lengua de Trapo
 2002, Manuel Moyano for El amigo de Kafka (short stories), Pretextos
 2003, José Luis Borau for Camisa de once varas (short stories), Alfaguara
 2004,  for El sueño de Borges (later published by Algaida)
 2005, Raúl Argemí for Siempre la misma música (later published by Algaida)
 2006, Esther Bendahan for La cara de Marte (later published by Algaida)
 2007,  for Niños de tiza (later published by Algaida)
 2009, Óscar Calavia for Las botellas del señor Klein, Lengua de Trapo
 2010,  for Bajo el influjo del cometa (short stories), Salto de Página 
 2011,  for Diarios, 1999-2003, Pepita de Calabazas (finalist: Óscar Esquivias with Pampanitos verdes)
 2012, Mario Martín Gijón for Inconvenientes del turismo en Praga y otros cuentos europeos, KRK (finalist:  with Ensimismada correspondencia, Lengua de Trapo)
 2014,  for Contarlo todo, Mondadori (finalist: Selva Almada for Ladrilleros, Mar dulce)
 2015, Samanta Schweblin for Distancia de rescate (finalist:  for Sin música)
 2016,  for Nemo (finalist: Juan José Becerra for El espectáculo del tiempo)
 2017, Pedro Mairal for La uruguaya (finalist:  for Kanada)
 2018,  for Años de mayor cuantía (finalist: Pablo Matilla for La sabiduría de quebrar huesos)

References

1977 establishments in Spain
Awards established in 1977
Spanish literary awards